An OPNAVINST or OPNAV Instruction is a formally documented lawful order that is issued by the Chief of Naval Operations.  These instructions are typically used to establish United States Navy policy, procedures, and requirements.  The instructions are issued in the form of a memorandum on official Department of the Navy letterhead.  Each instruction is referenced with an OPNAVINST directive number and a date.  Typically, when a new instruction supersedes a previous instruction, a cancellation notice citing the prior OPNAVINST number is included.

References 
For a list of OPNAV Instructions you can refer to the Department of the Navy Issuances website.

This article is a generalization of hundreds of OPNAV Instructions that have been issued.  For specific examples, see below:
 OPNAVINST 3591.1E SMALL ARMS TRAINING AND QUALIFICATION
 OPNAVINST 4790.4E SHIPS' MAINTENANCE AND MATERIAL MANAGEMENT (3-M) SYSTEM POLICY
 OPNAVINST 5100.23 NAVY SAFETY AND OCCUPATIONAL HEALTH (SOH) PROGRAM MANUAL
 OPNAVINST 5750.12 ANNUAL COMMAND OPERATION REPORT

Office of the Chief of Naval Operations
United States Department of Defense publications